Andrew Ang  (born 25 February 1946) is a Singaporean former judge of the Supreme Court. He obtained a Bachelor of Laws from the University of Singapore in 1971 and a Master of Laws from Harvard Law School in 1973. He lectured for a few years at the University of Singapore, and then worked as a lawyer at Messrs Lee & Lee for 30 years. He was appointed Judicial Commissioner in May 2004 and Judge in May 2005. After a decade on the Bench, he retired on 25 February 2014. In 2000, he was conferred the Pingat Bakti Masyarakat (PBM; Public Service Medal).

Education and career as a lawyer
Ang was born in Singapore on 25 February 1946. Having graduated from the University of Singapore with a Bachelor of Laws in 1971, he joined the University's Faculty of Law as a lecturer the following year. He obtained a Master of Laws from Harvard Law School in 1973. In 1974, he joined the law firm Lee & Lee, remaining there for 30 years until his retirement on 30 April 2004 as Senior Partner and Head of the Banking and Corporate Department. During this time, he was also a member of the advisory panel of the Monetary Authority of Singapore, and joined the board of Keppel Corporation in 2002.

Judicial career

Ang was appointed a Judicial Commissioner of the Supreme Court of Singapore on 15 May 2004, and a year later was elevated to the office of a Judge of the Supreme Court on 15 May 2005. He delivered about 170 written judgments, including Ngui Gek Lian Philomene v Chan Kiat (HSR International Realtors Pte. Ltd., intervener) (2013) in which he held that the S$590-million collective sale of Thomson View Condominium could not proceed because the marketing agent HSR International Realtors had paid some owners of units in the condominium to agree to the sale, thus breaching its duty to avoid a conflict of interest.

Ang also served as Chairman of the Singapore Mediation Centre (2006–2011) and the Legal Heritage Committee of the Singapore Academy of Law (2011–2014), and as Vice-Chairman of the Academy's Law Reform Committee (2006–2011). In addition, he was a member of the Advisory Board of the National University of Singapore Faculty of Law, and is currently on the Advisory Council of YMCA Singapore.

Upon reaching the retirement age of 65 years mandated by the Constitution on 25 February 2011, Ang was reappointed as a judge for another three years until he finally retired on 25 February 2014, having served a decade on the Bench. Upon his retirement, Chief Justice Sundaresh Menon said:

Later years
The Straits Times reported in February 2014 that Ang had been invited to rejoin his former law firm, Lee & Lee, as a consultant and would be undertaking arbitration and mediation work.

Awards and honours
In 2000, Ang was conferred the Pingat Bakti Masyarakat (PBM; Public Service Medal).

Notes

External links
Official website of the Supreme Court of Singapore

 

1946 births
Academic staff of the National University of Singapore Faculty of Law
Harvard Law School alumni
Living people
Recipients of the Pingat Bakti Masyarakat
20th-century Singaporean lawyers
21st-century Singaporean judges
Singaporean people of Chinese descent
University of Singapore alumni
YMCA leaders